The Iowa Army Ammunition Plant (IAAAP), located in Des Moines County in southeastern Iowa, near the city of Burlington, produces and delivers component assembly, and medium- and large-caliber ammunition items for the United States Department of Defense using modern production methods in support of worldwide operations. The facility is part of the US Army Joint Munitions Command.

Geography
The 19,011 acre plant is located at 17571 DMC Highway 79, Middletown, Iowa; 8 miles west of Burlington, Iowa.

History
The IAAAP was established in November 1940, as the Iowa Ordnance Plant and started production in 1941. Production was stopped in 1945, when World War II ended. The plant resumed its ammunition manufacturing mission in 1949. In 1950, in response to the Korean conflict, production increased dramatically. In 1975, the Army assumed responsibility for IAAAP.

Installation Overview
IAAAP is housed on 19,011 acres with 767 buildings, 271 igloos and storage capacity of 1,100,775 square feet. It also has 143 miles of roads and 102 miles of railroads. The installation has a government staff of 25 Department of the Army civilians and one soldier to provide contract oversight.  The government staff has a payroll budget of $2.5 million. It is a government-owned, contractor-operated facility and since contractor statistics are considered proprietary they are  unavailable.

Capabilities
40mm High Velocity Family 
155mm Artillery 
120mm Tank Rounds 
60mm/81mm/120mm Mortar Prop Charges 
M112 Charges/MICLIC (Mine-Clearing Line Charge) 
75mm/105mm Salute Rounds 
TOW/Hellfire/Javelin/Stinger/ Sidewinder Warheads 
Medium- and Large-Caliber Mortars 
Pressured and Cast Warheads 
Smart-Munitions Mines/Scatterable Mines 
Missile Assembly/Missile Warheads 
Rocket-assisted Projectiles 
Spider Grenades 
Demo Charges 
Detonators 
Salute Rounds 
Test Ranges 
Insensitive Munitions 
Development

Environmental contamination
In August 1989, IAAAP was placed on the National Priorities List (NPL), because explosives had caused surface water contamination beyond the installation boundary.
A Restoration Advisory Board keeps the public informed and involved in its clean-up activities.
A Restoration Advisory Board is in place. As of 2021, in its Fourth Five-Year Review Report. A March 2020  an area of potential Interest was identified within the OU-1 boundary, a fire training pit where the military used aqueous Film-Forming Foam for firefighting training, and PFOA, PFBS, and PFOS and potential exposure pathways need to be evaluated.

References

External links

1940 establishments in Iowa
Buildings and structures in Des Moines County, Iowa
Burlington, Iowa
Historic American Engineering Record in Iowa
Military installations in Iowa
Military Superfund sites
Superfund sites in Iowa
United States Army arsenals
Industrial installations of the United States Army
United States Army logistics installations